Sir William Hickman. 2nd Baronet  (8 January 1629 – 10 February 1682) was an English politician who sat in the House of Commons from 1660 to 1682.

Hickman was the son of Sir Willoughby Hickman, 1st Baronet and his wife Bridget Thornhaugh, daughter of Sir John Thornhaugh of Fenton, Nottinghamshire. He inherited the baronetcy on the death of his father in 1649.

In 1660, Hickman was elected Member of Parliament for East Retford in the Convention Parliament. He was re-elected MP for East Retford for the Cavalier Parliament in 1661 and held his seat through successive parliaments until his death in 1682. He was a Commissioner of the Ordnance from 1679 to his death.

Hickman died in 1682 at the age of 53. He had married Elizabeth Neville, daughter of John Nevile of Mattersey Priory, Nottinghamshire. He was succeeded in the baronetcy by their son Willoughby.

References

1629 births
1682 deaths
Baronets in the Baronetage of England
Deputy Lieutenants of Lincolnshire
Deputy Lieutenants of Nottinghamshire
English MPs 1660
English MPs 1661–1679
English MPs 1679
English MPs 1680–1681
English MPs 1681
High Sheriffs of Nottinghamshire